Roberto Taliento (born 8 July 1999) is an Italian footballer who plays as a goalkeeper for Serie D club Stresa Vergante.

Career

Atalanta 
Born in Segrate, Taliento was a youth exponent of Atalanta.

Loan to Giana Erminio 
On 17 July 2017, Taliento was loaned to Serie C club Giana Erminio on a season-long loan deal. On 8 November he made his professional debut in Serie C for Giana Erminio in a 4–3 home win over Piacenza, after 4 days, on 11 November, he kept his first clean sheet in a 0–0 away draw against Pisa. On 19 November he kept his second clean sheet in a 5–0 home win over Prato and after one week, on 26 November, Taliento kept his third clean in a 3–0 away win over Lucchese. Taliento ended his season-long loan to Giana Erminio with 19 appearances, 6 clean sheets and 33 goals conceded.

On 14 July 2018 his loan was extended for another season. Taliento started his second season at Giana Erminio with a 1–0 away win over Alessandria in the first round of Coppa Italia. On 5 August he played in a 4–0 away defeat against Crotone in the second round. On 16 September he played his first match and he kept his first clean sheet of the season in Serie C in a 0–0 away draw against Vicenza Virtus. Taliento ended his second season on loan at Giana Erminio with only 5 appearances, 10 goals conceded and 2 clean sheets.

Loan to Südtirol 
On 12 July 2019, Taliento was loaned to Serie C club Südtirol on a season-long loan deal. Six months later, on 19 January 2020, he made his debut for the club in a 4–1 home win over Rimini. Three days later, on 22 January, he kept his first clean sheet for Südtirol in a 2–0 home win over Vis Pesaro and eleven days later, on 2 February, he kept his second clean sheet in a 5–0 home win over Arzignano Valchiampo. On 16 February he kept his third clean sheet in a 2–0 home win over Alma Juventus Fano. Taliento ended his season-long loan to Südtirol with 7 appearances, 5 goals conceded and 3 clean sheet.

Monopoli
On 13 January 2021, Taliento joined Monopoli as a free agent until the end of the season. Five weeks later, on 21 February, he made his debut for the club as a starter and he also kept his first clean sheet in a 1–0 home win over Cavese.

Novara
On 9 December 2021, he moved to Novara as a free agent.

Career statistics

Club

References

External links
 

1999 births
Living people
Sportspeople from the Metropolitan City of Milan
Footballers from Lombardy
Italian footballers
Association football goalkeepers
Serie C players
Serie D players
Atalanta B.C. players
A.S. Giana Erminio players
F.C. Südtirol players
S.S. Monopoli 1966 players
Novara F.C. players